Oranjuly was an American alternative rock band based in Boston, Massachusetts founded in 2008 by American songwriter Brian E. King (singer/multi-instrumentalist). Their sound has been described by music journalists as a mix of Weezer and The Beach Boys because of their catchy songwriting, intricate arrangements and heavy usage of vocal harmonies. The name Oranjuly is a combination of King's favorite color and birth month.

Oranjuly's self-titled album was released on July 2, 2010, during a show at The Middle East.  Songs for the album were written and recorded by King over several years since his first songwriting sessions in 2005.

Members 

Though King recorded Oranjuly's songs himself, he recruited other Boston-based musicians to play live shows and occasionally record.

 Brian E. King - songs/arrangements/recordings, vocals, guitar, keys
 Lou Paniccia - drums
 Matt Girard - bass & guitar

Discography 
 Oranjuly (2010)

References

External links 
 
  Oranjuly on Facebook.
  Oranjuly on Twitter.

American power pop groups
Indie rock musical groups from Massachusetts
Musical groups from Boston